Martin Lundstedt (born 28 April 1967 in Mariestad, Sweden) is a Swedish businessman and has been President and CEO of the Volvo Group since 22 October 2015. He has 25 years' experience of development, production and sales within the heavy automotive industry.

Education
Lundstedt studied at Chalmers University of Technology and graduated with an MSc

Career
Following his exam, Lundstedt joined Scania as a trainee in 1992 and held a number of senior management positions during his 23 years with the company. He became president and CEO at Scania in 2012 and remained in that position until joining the Volvo Group.

Other activities
 European Round Table of Industrialists (ERT), Member

References

External links

 "Martin Lundstedt on volvogroup.com"

Swedish engineers
Chalmers University of Technology alumni
Volvo people
Swedish chief executives
1967 births
Living people